2004 Japanese Super Cup was the Japanese Super Cup competition. The match was played at National Stadium in Tokyo on March 6, 2004. Júbilo Iwata won the championship.

Match details

References

Japanese Super Cup
2004 in Japanese football
Yokohama F. Marinos matches
Júbilo Iwata matches
Japanese Super Cup 2004